Harry Loraine (aka Lorraine) (September 14, 1873 – 1935) was an American silent film actor. He appeared in more than 60 films between 1913 and 1930.

Selected filmography

 Who's Boss? (1914)
 She Married for Love (1914)
 Kidnapping the Kid (1914) 
 The Daddy of Them All (1914)
 Weary Willie's Rags (1914)
 They Looked Alike (1915)
 Spaghetti a la Mode (1915)
 Cupid's Target (1915)
 Shoddy the Tailor (1915)
 Who Stole the Doggies? (1915)
 Cannibal King (1915)
 Just Jim (1915)
 It Happened in Pikesville (1916)
 The Hawk's Trail (1919)
 The Last of the Mohicans (1920)
 The Lure of Egypt (1921)
 A Certain Rich Man (1921)
 The Hunch (1921)
 The Man of the Forest (1921)
 Garments of Truth (1921)
 The Lavender Bath Lady (1922)
 Don't Write Letters (1922)
 Little Eva Ascends (1922)
 Heart's Haven (1922)
 Slave of Desire (1923)
Siege (1925)
 Ace of Spades (1925)
 Steppin' Out (1925)
 The Vanishing West (1928)

References

External links

1873 births
1935 deaths
American male film actors
American male silent film actors
20th-century American male actors